Marshy Landscape is an oil painting created in 1883 by Vincent van Gogh.

Description
From 1883 to 1885, van Gogh lived in Drenthe, a remote district of the Netherlands, flat and riven with canals, a landscape of marsh and mist. Throughout 1883, the artist worked on his series of peasants' cottages, exploring the local terrain of marshes and peat fields, ditches and canals. Like much of his work of this period, Marshy Landscape is rendered with subdued earthy tones, giving the impression of being painted with the very soil itself.  Alone in the wilderness, Vincent drew upon the power of nature, the stillness and silence of the marshes inspiring him. He wrote to his brother Theo:

See also
Early works of Vincent van Gogh
List of works by Vincent van Gogh

References

External links

Paintings by Vincent van Gogh
1883 paintings
Water in art